The Microregion of Frederico Westphalen was one of the Microregions of the Rio Grande do Sul state, in Brazil. It belonged to the mesoregion of the Noroeste Rio-Grandense. Its population was estimated by the IBGE to be of 175,391 in 2005, divided in 27 municipalities. Its total area is 5,182.529 km². The IBGE has since discontinued the microregion system for population tracking, replacing it with the term "immediate geographic region".

Municipalities 
 Alpestre
 Ametista do Sul
 Caiçara
 Constantina
 Cristal do Sul
 Dois Irmãos das Missões
 Engenho Velho
 Erval Seco
 Frederico Westphalen
 Gramado dos Loureiros
 Iraí
 Liberato Salzano
 Nonoai
 Novo Tiradentes
 Novo Xingu
 Palmitinho
 Pinheirinho do Vale
 Planalto
 Rio dos Índios
 Rodeio Bonito
 Rondinha
 Seberi
 Taquaruçu do Sul
 Três Palmeiras
 Trindade do Sul
 Vicente Dutra
 Vista Alegre do Prata

References 

Microregions of Rio Grande do Sul
Rio Grande do Sul